Asura atritermina is a moth of the family Erebidae. It is found on Sumatra.

References

atritermina
Moths described in 1900
Moths of Indonesia